The coat of arms or national seal of Tonga (ko e Sila o Tonga) was designed in 1875 with the creation of the constitution.

Description 
There is no official specification of how exactly the arms should look. Even the shield on the front gate of the late king's palace is different from the old black/white copy used by the (ex-) government printer on all official stationery, is different from the copy on the prime minister's office webpage, etc. Some have pointed crowns, some rounded; some have normal flags, others have flags looking more like banners; some use the modern orthography, some the old (Ko e Otua mo Toga ko hoku Tofia); some have black swords, others white; and so forth.

Royal Standard 

The Royal Standard of Tonga is the monarch's personal flag and is an armorial banner of the Royal Arms of Tonga.

See also
 Flag of Tonga

Notes

External links

The Coat of Arms of the Kingdom of Tonga

National symbols of Tonga
Tonga
Tonga
1875 introductions
Tonga
Tonga
Tonga
Tonga
Tonga
Tonga
Tonga